Hangen-Weisheim is an Ortsgemeinde – a municipality belonging to a Verbandsgemeinde, a kind of collective municipality – in the Alzey-Worms district in Rhineland-Palatinate, Germany.

Geography

Location 
The municipality lies in Rhenish Hesse and belongs to the Verbandsgemeinde of Wonnegau, whose seat is in Osthofen.

History 
In 773, Hangen-Weisheim had its first documentary mention.

Politics

Municipal council 
The council is made up of 12 council members, who were elected by majority vote at the municipal election held on 7 June 2009, and the honorary mayor as chairman.

The municipal council has formed four boards: the building board, the agriculture, winegrowing, environment and graveyard board, the accounting control board and the grape harvest board, thereby showing the municipality's prevailing character as a winegrowing centre, with boards for both winegrowing and the grape harvest.

Coat of arms 
The municipality's arms might be described thus: Per fess gules the letter W surmounted by the letter H, except on the latter's cross stroke where the former surmounts it argent, and lozengy argent and azure, in base a mount of three vert.

Economy and infrastructure 
Hangen-Weisheim's economy is overwhelmingly based on agriculture. Besides the six businesses whose main line of work is agriculture and the many wineries and farms run as sidelines, there are also a woodworking shop, a roofing business, an institute for foot care, a carpentry shop, an engine-building business, a roof cleaning business, an insurance agency, a housewares shop, a country inn, a hairdresser, a restaurant at the municipal hall and a buchter's shop also featuring imported items and baked goods. For major purchases, however, such as textiles or furniture, people from Hangen-Weisheim must usually go to the surrounding service-industry centres like Alzey, Worms, Mainz or Mannheim

References

External links 
 Municipality’s official webpage 

Alzey-Worms